Colorado Music Buzz Magazine is a United States-based magazine devoted to Colorado music, arts and entertainment that is published monthly across the Front Range of Colorado. Colorado Music Buzz Magazine was founded in Parker, Colorado in 2005 by Keith Schneider and Eric F. Fletcher. The magazine is known for its positive coverage of the Colorado music scene with a focus on the bands and artists who have reached a mid level of success and have a chance to break nationally.

Multi genre format

Colorado Music Buzz Magazine contains coverage of a wide range of genres including: acoustic music, alternative rock, blues, bluegrass music, classical, country music, electronica, folk music, hardcore punk, hip hop, heavy metal music, jazz, musical theatre, punk rock, reggae, rock music and ska.

Notable cover story subjects
Colorado Music Buzz Magazine in its 7-year history has showcased several notable local Colorado musicians as well as Colorado politicians.  Bands such as: Devotchka Vol. 1 Issue 7, Flobots Vol. 2 Issue 4, The Fray Vol. 2 Issue 8, Tickle Me Pink, Vol. 3 Issue 1, Rose Hill Drive Vol. 3 Issue 3, Meese Vol. 3 Issue 10, and politicians such as Denver Mayor John Hickenlooper Vol. 2 Issue 6 and Eric Dyce entertainment coordinator for Red Rocks Vol 2. Issue 2. Since 2012, the majority of the magazines feature and cover stories have been written by Managing Editors Jenn Cohen and Tim Wenger.

Celebrity contributors
In December 2008, Ahrue Luster of alternative metal band Ill Niño began his monthly column "Road Block". In March 2009, Nathen Maxwell of the Celtic punk band Flogging Molly started his monthly column "View From The Stage". In the summer of 2008, Doug Haywood formerly of the Jackson Browne band partially serialized his upcoming novel. Also Rich Ross of Modulus Guitars and Flea contributes a monthly column entitled "Lessons from the Road". Uncle Nasty, formerly from KBPI and the DJs of KTNI-FM also contribute monthly columns. Flobots.org features their "Youth on Record" column monthly.

Notable interviews
Colorado Music Buzz Magazine has had several notable interviews with major musical artists in its pages, including Bill Stevenson of the punk bands Descendents and All and co-founder of The Blasting Room recording studio in Fort Collins, Colorado; JR Swartz, formerly of nu metal band Motograter who is currently with Curiosity Kills; Grammy Award-winning jazz and a cappella vocalist Bobby McFerrin; Josh "JP" Paul, bass player for rock band Daughtry; vocalist Ivan Moody of heavy metal band Five Finger Death Punch who is from Westminster, Colorado; and David Ellefson, former bass player for heavy metal band Megadeth and current bassist for F5.

Interesting facts

Jesse Walker, bassist for the Flobots, was a contributing writer for Colorado Music Buzz Magazine up until the rigors of touring took over his time.

External links
 Official Colorado Music Buzz Magazine website

Monthly magazines published in the United States
Music magazines published in the United States
Magazines established in 2005
Parker, Colorado
Magazines published in Colorado
2005 establishments in Colorado